Empire State is a 2013 American crime drama film centered on two childhood friends who rob an armored car repository and the NYPD officer who stands in their way. Directed by Dito Montiel and starring Liam Hemsworth, Emma Roberts and Dwayne Johnson, the film was released straight to DVD and Blu-ray on September 3, 2013.  It is based on a true story.

Plot
Chris Potamitis lives with his parents and younger sister in the Bronx in the early 1980s. His immigrant father is fired from his job after 10 years of cleaning a shady Greek social club. Chris fails to get into the police academy because of a previous marijuana conviction. He gets a low-paying job as a security guard with the Empire Armored Car Company, where security is extremely poor, morale is equally bad, and no reliable records are kept of money collected or stored. His partner is killed during a robbery, but the company gives the dead man's family only $5,000 in compensation rather than the $50,000 they are entitled to. After Chris is demoted to the position of night watchman, he steals one of the money bags he is guarding and gives some of the cash to his partner's widow.

Chris makes the mistake of showing the money to his loud-mouthed best friend Eddie and telling him about the company's worse-than-lax security. Eddie shares this information with Spiro, a gangster he wants to impress, and Spiro stages a robbery that is foiled by James Ransome, a veteran detective in the New York Police Department who has been tipped off. A gun battle ensues in which two of the robbers are killed. Then, on December 12, 1982, Eddie breaks into the company through the roof in the middle of the night, and he hectors a weak-willed Chris into opening the vault. Eddie knocks out Chris and steals $11 million in cash, the single largest cash robbery in U.S. history, exceeding the $5.8 million Lufthansa heist in December 1978. Eddie gives $3 million of the loot to Chris.

The FBI goes after the Five Families of organized crime, but Ransome decides that Chris, Eddie, and their associates need to be investigated. Eddie and his gangster friend Michael attempt to exchange $8 million of the loot for Colombian drugs, but the deal goes bad and Michael and the Colombians shoot it out. Meanwhile, Spiro demands that Chris turn over the money to him. Ransome arrests Eddie and asks where Chris and the rest of the money are, but Eddie says nothing and is released. Chris tells his friend Nancy that the money is hidden in a statue that he and Eddie had given to his mother. Eddie confronts Chris with a gun and demands that he hand over the money, but Chris' father shoots and wounds Eddie just before the police arrive and arrest all three men. Chris and Eddie are released from federal prison on October 10, 1991, but the money is never recovered.

Cast
 Liam Hemsworth as Chris Potamitis
 Emma Roberts as Nancy Michaelides
 Dwayne Johnson as Detective James Ransome
 Michael Angarano as Eddie
 Nikki Reed as Lizzette
 Paul Ben-Victor as Tommy Potamitis
 Jerry Ferrara as Jimmy "The Greek"
 Greg Vrotsos as Mike Dimitriu
 Michael Rispoli as Tony Cappolitti
 Wayne Pére as Williams
 Craig Leydecker as Chilewski
 Shenae Grimes as Eleni
 Sharon Angela as Dina Potamitis
 Chris Diamantopoulos as Spiro Stavrakis
 Lucky Johnson as Phil Johnson
 James Ransone as Agent Nugent
 Gia Mantegna as Vicky Potamitis

Production
Shooting took place in New Orleans in 2012.

Soundtrack
The soundtrack to Empire State was released on September 3, 2013.

Release 
Empire State premiered at the Gasparilla International Film Festival on March 19, 2013.  It grossed $187,500 in Croatia, Mexico, and Thailand.  Lionsgate Home Entertainment released the film on DVD and Blu-ray in the US on September 3, 2013, and it grossed $4 million.

Reception 
John Ferguson of the Radio Times rated it 2/5 stars and wrote that the film features "committed performances" but can not decide whether it is a gritty drama or flashy heist film.

References

External links
 
 

2013 films
2013 direct-to-video films
2013 crime drama films
American crime drama films
American heist films
Direct-to-video drama films
Films directed by Dito Montiel
Crime films based on actual events
Films about bank robbery
Films set in the 1980s
Films set in Queens, New York
Films shot in New Orleans
Films shot in New York City
Films shot in Toronto
Lionsgate films
MoviePass Films films
Voltage Pictures films
2010s English-language films
2010s American films